Scott Black may refer to:

 Scott C. Black (born 1952), American military lawyer and former Judge Advocate General of the US Army
 Scott M. Black, American investor, philanthropist and art collector